Guide to Hell is an accessory for the 2nd edition of the Advanced Dungeons & Dragons fantasy role-playing game, published in 1999.

Contents
Guide to Hell offers players new spells, magic items, character class kits, and a new race, a devilkin – half devil, half human. Chapter One introduces a new turning table for clerics and paladins that is specific to turning devils. A brief section titled "The Cults" demonstrates how devils can use humans as tools in their schemes. Also included is "Invasion", a scenario where devils invade the Prime Material Plane.

Publication history
Guide to Hell was published by TSR and written by Chris Pramas.

Reception
Guide to Hell was reviewed by the online version of Pyramid on November 19, 1999. The reviewer considered this book "a giant rehash that still fails to capture what was in the old articles of Dragon magazine", specifically naming Ed Greenwood's "The Nine Hells Part I and II" from Dragon #75 and #76 and "The Nine Hells Revisited" from Dragon #91, calling them "classics that provided vast amounts of information. The page total on these three articles alone is close to 30 pages. Throw in other articles like "Eight Devilish Questions," (#91) by Ed Greenwood, and "The Lords of the Nine" (#223) by Colin McComb, and you've almost got more pages than the new Guide to Hell has." The reviewer did say that for anyone who does not own those back issues or the Dragon Magazine Archive, "the Guide to Hell offers very modular chapters that should be easy to put in most campaigns", and that the information in Chapter One should "give inexperienced DMs some ideas for devils in their games".

Reviews
Game Reviews magazine

References

Dungeons & Dragons sourcebooks
Role-playing game supplements introduced in 1999